Carlos Arturo Abarza Chávez (born 15 November 1969) is a Chilean sport shooter. He competed in the skeet event at the 1992 Summer Olympics.

References

1969 births
Living people
Skeet shooters
Shooters at the 1991 Pan American Games
Shooters at the 1992 Summer Olympics
Shooters at the 1995 Pan American Games
Chilean male sport shooters
Olympic shooters of Chile
20th-century Chilean people
Carabineros de Chile